Battel is a term used at the University of Oxford for the food ordered by members of the college.

Battel may also refer to:

 Battel, a hamlet of Mechelen, historical part of the Lordship of Mechelen
 Kaiju Big Battel, American performance entertainment troupe based in Boston

People 
 Albert Battel (1891–1952), German Wehrmacht officer, lawyer, and humanitarian
 Carlo Battel (b. 1972), Italian ski mountaineer
 Edward Battel or Battell, British racing cyclist

See also 
 Battle (disambiguation)